Trichomycterus stawiarski is a species of pencil catfish endemic to Brazil, where it occurs in the upper Iguaçu river basin.

References

stawiarski
Freshwater fish of Brazil
Endemic fauna of Brazil
Fish described in 1968
Taxa named by Paulo de Miranda-Ribeiro